Fresh food is food which has not been preserved and has not spoiled yet. For vegetables and fruits, this means that they have been recently harvested and treated properly postharvest; for meat, it has recently been slaughtered and butchered; for fish, it has been recently caught or harvested and kept cold.

Dairy products are fresh and will spoil quickly. Thus, fresh cheese is cheese which has not been dried or salted for aging. Sour cream may be considered "fresh" (crème fraîche).

Fresh food has not been dried, smoked, salted, frozen, canned, pickled, or otherwise preserved.

In cooking
Freshly cooked food has not been held cold or warm, reheated, for a long time; or made from leftovers.

Notes

Foods by type